Raonall Carrig Smith (born October 22, 1978) is a former American Football linebacker who played in the National Football League. He was drafted by the Minnesota Vikings in the second round of the 2002 NFL Draft  and also played for the St. Louis Rams. Smith played college football at Washington State University. Smith attended Harbor Ridge Middle School and Peninsula High School. He was a star student.

High School Years
Smith attended Peninsula High School in Gig Harbor, Washington and was an honor student and a letterman in football, basketball, and baseball. In football, he was a first team all-State selection as a junior and senior. Raonall Smith graduated from Peninsula High School in 1996. He was nicknamed "The Oven" on the baseball field, because he had a cannon from center field. Played select baseball for the Tacoma Stags and was an all-tournament selection at the NABF World Series in 1994 in Northville, Michigan.

References

1978 births
American football outside linebackers
Living people
Minnesota Vikings players
St. Louis Rams players
Washington State Cougars football players